The Crozzon di Lares is a mountain in Trentino-Alto Adige, Italy. It is located in Val Rendena, Province of Trento.

Its summit was conquered for the first time by a young Bohemian climber, Julius von Payer, along with Coronna, Gries and Hayer, on 3 September 1868; on the same day they also reached the nearby Corno di Cavento.

It was the theater of bitter fighting during World War I; held by Austro-Hungarian troops, it was captured by the Alpini on 29 April 1916. Remains of soldiers killed in World War I are sometimes found by mountaineers due to the melting of the nearby glacier.

References

Mountains of the Alps
Alpine three-thousanders
Mountains of Trentino